Llinares is one of eight parishes in Proaza, a municipality within the province and autonomous community of Asturias, in northern Spain. 

The postal code is 33114.

Villages
 Las Veigas
 La Polea
 La Rebellada 
 Llinares
 El Cantu
 El Cantu Solailesia
 El Carbayón
 La Esquina
 La Fonte Beninu
 L'Oral
 Los Pedreiros
 La Portiella
 La Raya
 El Valle

References

Parishes in Proaza